A Fairy-Tale Wedding is a 2014 Italian romantic comedy film directed by Carlo Vanzina.

Cast
Adriano Giannini as Luca Maggi
Ricky Memphis as Daniele Baldini
Paola Minaccioni as Paola De Donno
Andrea Osvárt as Barbara Meyer
Giorgio Pasotti as Alessandro Germani
Stefania Rocca as Luciana Rivetti
Riccardo Rossi as Fabio Rocchetti
Emilio Solfrizzi as Giovanni Guastamaglia
Ilaria Spada as Sara Farinacci
Max Tortora as Nando Croce
Luca Angeletti as Roberto Astolfi
Pia Engleberth as Brunella Mittelmach
Teco Celio as Casimiro Guallinetti
Stephan Käfer as Michael Timonov
Gabrielle Scharnitzky as Ludmilla Pitermev
Francesco Cataldo as Angelo Guerrini
Roberta Fiorentini as Iole Capozzi

References

External links

2014 films
Films directed by Carlo Vanzina
2010s Italian-language films
2014 romantic comedy films
Italian romantic comedy films
2010s Italian films